The Brahmo Boys School is a boys' school of Kolkata, in the state of West Bengal, India. It is guided by the principles of the Brahmo Samaj movement. Gurucharan Mahalanobis, the grandfather of Prasanta Chandra Mahalanobis, was its founder.

Notable alumni 
Prasanta Chandra Mahalanobis
Andre Beteille

References

Academic institutions associated with the Bengal Renaissance
Hinduism in Kolkata
Schools affiliated with the Brahmo Samaj